VTune Profiler (formerly VTune Amplifier) is a performance analysis tool for x86 based machines running Linux or Microsoft Windows operating systems. Many features work on both Intel and AMD hardware, but advanced hardware-based sampling requires an Intel-manufactured CPU.

VTune is available for free as a stand-alone tool or as part of the Intel oneAPI Base Toolkit. Optional paid priority support is available for the oneAPI Base Toolkit.

Features

 Languages C, C++, Data Parallel C++ (DPC++), C#, Fortran, Java, Python, Go, OpenCL, assembly and any mix. Other native languages that follow standards can also be profiled.
 ProfilesProfiles include algorithm, microarchitecture, parallelism, I/O, system, thermal throttling and accelerators (GPU and FPGA).
 Local, Remote, Server  VTune supports local and remote performance profiling.  It can be run as an application with a graphical interface, as a command line or as a server accessible by multiple users via a web browser.

See also 

 Intel Advisor
 Intel Inspector
 oneAPI (compute acceleration)
 Intel Developer Zone
 List of performance analysis tools

References

External links 

 
 VTune Profiler
 Intel oneAPI Base Toolkit

Intel software
Profilers